Hiraea perplexa is a species of plant in the Malpighiaceae family and is endemic to Ecuador.  Its natural habitat is subtropical or tropical moist lowland forests.

References

Malpighiaceae
Endemic flora of Ecuador
Vulnerable plants
Taxonomy articles created by Polbot